Fehim Mezhgorani (12 August 1874 – 4 February 1930) was one of the delegates of the Albanian Declaration of Independence.

Along with Dhimitër Tutulani he worked under Petro Poga to draft the Statute that separated the Albanian Justice system from the jurisdiction of the Ottoman Empire.

References

19th-century Albanian politicians
20th-century Albanian politicians
All-Albanian Congress delegates
People from Tepelenë